Standings and Results for Group L of the Last 32 phase of the 2014–15 Eurocup basketball tournament.

Standings

References

2014–15 Eurocup Basketball